Bariki may refer to:
 Bariki, Afghanistan
 Bariki-ye Hasan Qoli
 Bariki-ye Mohammad Qoli